Spaniopappus is a genus of Cuban plants in the tribe Eupatorieae within the family Asteraceae.

 Species
 Spaniopappus buchii (B.L.Rob.) R.M.King & H.Rob.
 Spaniopappus ekmanii B.L.Rob.
 Spaniopappus hygrophilus (Alain) R.M.King & H.Rob.
 Spaniopappus iodostylus (B.L.Rob.) R.M.King & H.Rob.
 Spaniopappus ruckeri (B.L.Rob.) R.M.King & H.Rob.
 Spaniopappus shaferi (B.L.Rob.) R.M.King & H.Rob.

References

Asteraceae genera
Endemic flora of Cuba
Eupatorieae